"Jessie" is a song by American singer-songwriter Joshua Kadison, released in May 1993 as the debut and lead single from his first album, Painted Desert Serenade (1993), but did not become a hit in continental Europe until 1994 and in the United Kingdom until 1995 (on its third release). The song was a top-10 hit in Austria, Denmark, the Netherlands, and New Zealand.

Content
The song describes the narrator's tumultuous relationship with a woman named Jessie. The person named Jessie in this song was rumoured to be Sarah Jessica Parker, with whom Kadison was involved at the time. This has never been confirmed, and it has also been pointed out that Parker has never been known to be called "Jessie" or own a cat named Moses. In a 2018 appearance on Andy Cohen's Watch What Happens Live, Sarah Jessica Parker was asked about the song, and whether it is about her, and she responded with surprise, saying "I don't know who that person is... I've never met this person... That never happened, to my recollection. I'm pretty clear about who I dated." In 1997, she married actor Matthew Broderick. In a 1994 interview with Los Angeles Times, Kadison told about the song, "It's a song that a lot of people can relate to. Everybody's heart has been broken by somebody they'll always love. That's what this song is about.. It taps into a feeling that's buried in so many people."

Critical reception
The song received positive reviews from music critics. AllMusic editor Bryan Buss noted that it is "about the searching title heroine and the hopeful, needing narrator who gets sucked into her longing, he paints vivid portrayals of troubled and hopeful dreamers. With lyrics like "Jessie, paint your pictures/'bout how it's gonna be/by now I should know better/your dreams are never free," Kadison taps into the wanderer in all of us." Larry Flick from Billboard wrote that the singer "indulges in a worldly, intelligent brand of storytelling that aims to place him among late luminaries Jim Croce and Harry Chapin. Poignant piano ballad actually is more along the lines of early Billy Joel. Sophisticated, complex production". Dave Sholin from the Gavin Report complimented the "beautiful melody and catchy chorus" of the song. 

In his weekly UK chart commentary, James Masterton commented, "Quite why everyone was so keen for this to be a hit I am unclear, its a pretty enough romantic ballad but nothing extremely exciting." Pan-European magazine Music & Media said that it "could tear down walls like "Walking in Memphis" did for Marc Cohn." Alan Jones from Music Week described it as a "extremely attractive piano-led, mid-tempo ballad", noting that "along with a warm vocal style (two parts Billy Joel to one Jim Croce) Kadison has a fine melodic sense, and this lyrical song deserves to be heard." John Kilgo from The Network Forty felt that a "soulful bluesy delivery exemplifies the main strength of newcomer Joshua Kadison, who reaches new heights with this electrifying piano ballad."

Music video
The accompanying music video for "Jessie" was directed by Piers Plowden.

Track listing
 CD single
 "Jessie" (edit) – 4:19
 "Jessie" (album version) – 5:18
 "When a Woman Cries" – 3:31
 "All I Ever Ask" – 4:39

Charts

Weekly charts

Year-end charts

Release history

References

1993 songs
1993 debut singles
1994 singles
1995 singles
Joshua Kadison songs
Song recordings produced by Rod Argent
Sentimental ballads